Carlos Humberto Ramos Rivera (born 29 April 1958) is a Chilean former footballer.

References

1958 births
Living people
Association football forwards
Chilean footballers
Olympic footballers of Chile
Footballers at the 1984 Summer Olympics
Universidad de Chile footballers